PNU-142633 is an experimental drug candidate for the treatment of migraine. It exerts its effect as a selective, high affinity 5-HT1D receptor antagonist. PNU-142633 is well tolerated after oral administration.

It was an interesting candidate due to its greater affinity for 5-HT1D compared to 5-HT1B receptors (typical migraine drugs such as triptans are agonists for both receptors), but experimental results were disappointing.

The structure can be compared favorably with Sonepiprazole.

References

Serotonin receptor antagonists
Phenylpiperazines
Benzamides
Isochromenes